The 1970s (pronounced "nineteen-seventies"; commonly shortened to the "Seventies" or the "70s") was a decade that began on January 1, 1970, and ended on December 31, 1979.

In the 21st century, historians have increasingly portrayed the 1970s as a "pivot of change" in world history, focusing especially on the economic upheavals that followed the end of the postwar economic boom. On a global scale, it was characterized by frequent coups, domestic conflicts and civil wars, and various political upheaval and armed conflicts which arose from or were related to decolonization, and the global struggle between NATO, the Warsaw Pact, and the Non-Aligned Movement. Many regions had periods of high-intensity conflict, notably Southeast Asia, the Mideast, and Africa.

In the Western world, social progressive values that began in the 1960s, such as increasing political awareness and economic liberty of women, continued to grow. In the United Kingdom, the 1979 election resulted in the victory of its Conservative leader Margaret Thatcher, the first female British Prime Minister. Industrialized countries experienced an economic recession due to an oil crisis caused by oil embargoes by the Organization of Arab Petroleum Exporting Countries. The crisis saw the first instance of stagflation which began a political and economic trend of the replacement of Keynesian economic theory with neoliberal economic theory, with the first neoliberal government coming to power with the 1973 Chilean coup d'état.

The 1970s was also an era of great technological and scientific advances; since the appearance of the first commercial microprocessor, the Intel 4004 in 1971, the decade was characterised by a profound transformation of computing units – by then rudimentary, spacious machines – into the realm of portability and home accessibility.

On the other hand, there were also great advances in fields such as physics, which saw the consolidation of quantum field theory at the end of the decade, mainly thanks to the confirmation of the existence of quarks and the detection of the first gauge bosons in addition to the photon, the Z boson and the gluon, part of what was christened in 1975 as the Standard Model.

In Asia, the People's Republic of China international relations changed significantly following its recognition by the United Nations, the death of Mao Zedong and the beginning of market liberalization by Mao's successors. Despite facing an oil crisis due to the OPEC embargo, the economy of Japan witnessed a large boom in this period, overtaking the economy of West Germany to become the second-largest in the world. The United States withdrew its military forces from the Vietnam War. In 1979, the Soviet Union invaded Afghanistan, which led to the Soviet–Afghan War.

The 1970s saw an initial increase in violence in the Middle East as Egypt and Syria declared war on Israel, but in the late 1970s, the situation in the Middle East was fundamentally altered when Egypt signed the Egyptian–Israeli Peace Treaty. Political tensions in Iran exploded with the Iranian Revolution in 1979, which overthrew the Pahlavi dynasty and established an Islamic republic under the leadership of Ayatollah Khomeini.

Africa saw further decolonization in the decade, with Angola and Mozambique gaining their independence in 1975 from the Portuguese Empire after the Carnation Revolution in Portugal. The continent was, however, plagued by endemic military coups, with the long-reigning Emperor of Ethiopia Haile Selassie being removed, civil wars and famine.

The economies of much of the developing world continued to make steady progress in the early 1970s because of the Green Revolution. However, their economic growth was slowed by the oil crisis, although it boomed afterwards.

The 1970s saw the world population increase from 3.7 to 4.4 billion, with approximately 1.23 billion births and 475 million deaths occurring during the decade.

Politics and wars

Wars

The most notable wars and/or other conflicts of the decade include:
The Cold War (1945–1991)
 The Vietnam War came to a close in 1975 with the fall of Saigon and the unconditional surrender of South Vietnam on April 30, 1975. The following year, Vietnam was officially declared reunited.
 Soviet–Afghan War (1979–1989) – Although taking place almost entirely throughout the 1980s, the war officially started on December 27, 1979.
 Angolan Civil War (1975–2002) – resulting in intervention by multiple countries on the Marxist and anti-Marxist sides, with Cuba and Mozambique supporting the Marxist faction while South Africa and Zaire support the anti-Marxists.
 Cambodian Civil War (1967–1975) ends with the Khmer Rouge establishing Democratic Kampuchea.
 Ethiopian Civil War (1974–1991)
 The Portuguese Colonial War (1961–1974)
 The Bangladesh Liberation War of 1971 in South Asia, engaging East Pakistan, West Pakistan, and India
 1971 Bangladesh genocide
 Indo-Pakistani War of 1971
 Arab–Israeli conflict (Early 20th century–present) 
 Yom Kippur War (1973) – the war was launched by Egypt and Syria against Israel in October 1973 to recover territories lost by the Arabs in the 1967 conflict. The Israelis were taken by surprise and suffered heavy losses before they rallied. In the end, they managed to repel the Egyptians (and a simultaneous attack by Syria in the Golan Heights) and crossed the Suez Canal into Egypt proper. In 1978, Egypt signed a peace treaty with Israel at Camp David in the United States, ending outstanding disputes between the two countries. Sadat's actions would lead to his assassination in 1981.
 Indian emergency (1975–1977)
 Lebanese Civil War (1975–1990) – A civil war in the Middle East which at times also involved the PLO and Israel during the early 1980s.
 Western Sahara War (1975–1991) – A regional war pinning the rebel Polisario Front against Morocco and Mauritania.
 Ugandan–Tanzanian War (1978–1979) – the war which was fought between Uganda and Tanzania was based on an expansionist agenda to annex territory from Tanzania. The war resulted in the overthrow of Idi Amin's regime.
 The Ogaden War (1977–1978) was another African conflict between Somalia and Ethiopia over control of the Ogaden region.
 The Rhodesian Bush War (1964–1979)

International conflicts

The most notable International conflicts of the decade include:
 Major conflict between capitalist and communist forces in multiple countries, while attempts are made by the Soviet Union and the United States to lessen the chance for conflict, such as both countries endorsing nuclear nonproliferation.
 In June 1976, peaceful student protests in the Soweto township of South Africa by black students against the use of Afrikaans in schools led to the Soweto uprising which killed more than 176 people, overwhelmingly by South Africa's Security Police.
 Rise of separatism in the province of Quebec in Canada. In 1970, radical Quebec nationalist and Marxist militants of the Front de libération du Québec (FLQ) kidnapped the Quebec labour minister Pierre Laporte and British Trade Commissioner James Cross during the October Crisis, resulting in Laporte being killed, and the enactment of martial law in Canada under the War Measures Act, resulting in a campaign by the Canadian government which arrests suspected FLQ supporters. The election of the Parti Québécois led by René Lévesque in the province of Quebec in Canada, brings the first political party committed to Quebec independence into power in Quebec. Lévesque's government pursues an agenda to secede Quebec from Canada by democratic means and strengthen Francophone Québécois culture in the late 1970s, such as the controversial Charter of the French Language more commonly known in Quebec and Canada as "Bill 101".
 Martial law was declared in the Philippines on September 21, 1972, by dictator Ferdinand Marcos.
 In Cambodia, the communist leader Pol Pot led a revolution against the American-backed government of Lon Nol. On April 17, 1975, Pot's forces captured Phnom Penh, the capital, two years after America had halted the bombings of their positions. His communist government, the Khmer Rouge, forced people out of the cities to clear jungles and establish a radical, Marxist agrarian society. Buddhist priests and monks, along with anyone who spoke foreign languages, had any sort of education, or even wore glasses were tortured or killed. As many as 3 million people may have died. Vietnam invaded the country at the start of 1979, overthrowing the Khmer Rouge and installing a satellite government. This provoked a brief, but furious border war with China in February of that year.
 The Iranian Revolution of 1979 transformed Iran from an autocratic pro-Western monarchy under Shah Mohammad Reza Pahlavi to a theocratic Islamist government under the leadership of Ayatollah Ruhollah Khomeini. Distrust between the revolutionaries and Western powers led to the Iran hostage crisis on November 4, 1979, where 66 diplomats, mainly from the United States, were held captive for 444 days.
 Growing internal tensions take place in Yugoslavia beginning with the Croatian Spring movement in 1971 which demands greater decentralization of power to the constituent republics of Yugoslavia. Yugoslavia's communist ruler Joseph Broz Tito subdues the Croatian Spring movement and arrests its leaders, but does initiate major constitutional reform resulting in the 1974 Constitution which decentralized powers to the republics, gave them the official right to separate from Yugoslavia, and weakened the influence of Serbia (Yugoslavia's largest and most populous constituent republic) in the federation by granting significant powers to the Serbian autonomous provinces of Kosovo and Vojvodina. In addition, the 1974 Constitution consolidated Tito's dictatorship by proclaiming him president-for-life. The 1974 Constitution would become resented by Serbs and began a gradual escalation of ethnic tensions.

Coups

The most prominent coups d'état of the decade include:
 1970 – Coup in Syria, led by Hafez al-Assad.
 1971 – Military coup in Uganda led by Idi Amin.
 1973 – Coup d'état in Chile on September 11th, Salvador Allende was overthrown and killed in a military attack on the presidential palace. Augusto Pinochet takes power backed by the military junta.
 1974 – Military coup in Ethiopia led to the overthrowing of Haile Selassie by the communist junta led by General Aman Andom and Mengistu Haile Mariam, ending one of the world's longest-lasting monarchies in history.
 1974 – (25 April) Carnation Revolution in Portugal started as a military coup organized by the Armed Forces Movement (Portuguese: Movimento das Forças Armadas, MFA) composed of military officers who opposed the Portuguese fascist regime, but the movement was soon coupled with an unanticipated and popular campaign of civil support. It would ultimately lead to the decolonization of all its colonies, but leave power vacuums that led to civil war in newly independent Lusophone African nations.
 1975 – Sheikh Mujibur Rahman, President of Bangladesh, and almost his entire family was assassinated in the early hours of August 15, 1975, when a group of Bangladesh Army personnel went to his residence and killed him, during a coup d'état.
 1976 – Jorge Rafael Videla seizes control of Argentina in 1976 through a coup sponsored by the Argentine military, establishing himself as a dictator of a military junta government in the country.
 1977 – Military coup in Pakistan political leaders including Zulfikar Ali Bhutto arrested. Martial law declared
 1979 – an Attempted coup in Iran, backed by the United States, to overthrow the interim government, which had come to power after the Iranian Revolution.
 1979 – Coup in El Salvador, President General Carlos Humberto Romero, was overthrown by junior ranked officers, that formed a Junta government, which lead the beginning of a 12-year civil war.

Terrorist attacks

The most notable terrorist attacks of the decade include:
 The Munich massacre takes place at the 1972 Summer Olympics in Munich, Germany, where Palestinians belonging to the terrorist group Black September organization kidnapped and murdered eleven Israeli athletes.
 Rise in the use of terrorism by militant organizations across the world. Groups in Europe like the Red Brigades and the Baader-Meinhof Gang were responsible for a spate of bombings, kidnappings, and murders. Violence continued in Northern Ireland and the Middle East. Radical American groups existed as well, such as the Weather Underground and the Symbionese Liberation Army, but they never achieved the size or strength of their European counterparts.
On September 6, 1970, the world witnessed the beginnings of modern rebellious fighting in what is today called as Skyjack Sunday. Palestinian terrorists hijacked four airliners and took over 300 people on board as hostage. The hostages were later released, but the planes were blown up.

Prominent political events
Worldwide
 1973 oil crisis and 1979 energy crisis
 The presence and rise of a significant number of women as heads of state and heads of government in a number of countries across the world, many being the first women to hold such positions, such as Soong Ching-ling continuing as the first Chairwoman of the People's Republic of China until 1972, Isabel Perón as the first woman President in Argentina in 1974 until being deposed in 1976, Elisabeth Domitien becomes the first woman Prime Minister of Central African Republic, Indira Gandhi continuing as Prime Minister of India until 1977, Lidia Gueiler Tejada becoming the interim President of Bolivia beginning from 1979 to 1980, Maria de Lourdes Pintasilgo becoming the first woman Prime Minister of Portugal in 1979, and Margaret Thatcher becoming the first woman Prime Minister of the United Kingdom in 1979.

Americas

 United States President Richard Nixon resigned as president on August 9, 1974, while facing charges for impeachment for the Watergate scandal.
 Augusto Pinochet rose to power as ruler of Chile after overthrowing the country's Socialist president Salvador Allende in 1973 with the assistance of the Central Intelligence Agency (CIA) of the United States. Pinochet would remain the dictator of Chile until 1990.
 Argentine president Isabel Peron begins the Dirty War, where the military and security forces hunt down left-wing political dissidents as part of Operation Condor. She is overthrown in a military coup in 1976, and Jorge Rafael Videla comes to power and continues the Dirty War until the military junta relinquished power in 1983. 
 Suriname was granted independence from the Netherlands on November 25, 1975.
 In Guyana, the Rev. Jim Jones led several hundred people from his People's Temple in California to create and maintain a Utopian Marxist commune in the jungle named Jonestown. Amid allegations of corruption, mental, sexual, and physical abuse by Jones on his followers, and denying them the right to leave Jonestown, a Congressional committee and journalists visited Guyana to investigate in November 1978. The visitors (and several of those trying to leave Jonestown with them) were attacked and shot by Jones' guards at the airport while trying to depart Guyana together. Congressman Leo Ryan was among those who were shot to death. The demented Jones then ordered everyone in the commune to commit suicide. The people drank or were forced to drink, cyanide-laced fruit punch (Flavor Aid). A total of over 900 dead were found (approximately 1/3 of which were children), including Jones, who had shot himself.  Multiple units of the United States military were organized, mobilized, and sent to Guyana to recover over 900 deceased Jonestown residents.  After rejections from the Guyanese Government for the United States to bury the Jonestown dead in Guyana, US military personnel were then tasked to prepare and transport the human remains from Guyana for burial in the USA.  The US General Accounting Office later detailed an approximate cost of $4.4 million (in taxpayer dollars) for Jonestown's clean-up and recovery operation expenses. 
 The Somoza dictatorship in Nicaragua is ousted in 1979 by the Sandinista National Liberation Front, leading to the Contra War in the 1980s.  
 Greenland was granted self-government (or "home rule") within the Kingdom of Denmark on November 29, 1979.

Europe

 Margaret Thatcher and the Conservative party rose to power in the United Kingdom in 1979, initiating a neoliberal economic policy of reducing government spending, weakening the power of trade unions, and promoting economic and trade liberalization.
 Francisco Franco died after 39 years in power. Juan Carlos I was crowned king of Spain and called for the reintroduction of democracy. The dictatorship in Spain ended. The first general elections were held in 1977 and Adolfo Suárez became Prime minister of Spain after his Centrist Democratic Union won. The Socialist and Communist parties were legalized. The current Spanish Constitution was signed in 1978.
 In 1972, Erich Honecker was chosen to lead East Germany, a role he would fill for the whole of the 1970s and 1980s. The mid-1970s were a time of extreme recession for East Germany, and as a result of the country's higher debts, consumer goods became more and more scarce. If East Germans had enough money to procure a television set, a telephone, or a Trabant automobile, they were placed on waiting lists which caused them to wait as much as a decade for the item in question.
 The Troubles in Northern Ireland continued, with an explosion of political violence erupting in the early 1970s. Notable attacks include the McGurk's Car bombing, the Bloody Sunday massacre, and the Dublin and Monaghan bombings. 
 The Soviet Union under the leadership of Leonid Brezhnev, having the largest armed forces and the largest stockpile of nuclear weapons in the world, pursued an agenda to lessen tensions with its rival superpower, the United States, for most of the seventies. That policy known as détente abruptly ended with the Soviet invasion in Afghanistan at the end of 1979. While known as a "period of stagnation" in Soviet historiography, the Seventies are largely considered as a sort of a golden age of the USSR in terms of stability and relative well-being. Nevertheless, hidden inflation continued to increase for the second straight decade, and production consistently fell short of demand in agriculture and consumer goods manufacturing. By the end of the 1970s, signs of social and economic stagnation were becoming very pronounced.
 Enver Hoxha's rule in Albania was characterized in the 1970s by growing isolation, first from a very public schism with the Soviet Union the decade before, and then by a split in friendly relations with China in 1978. Albania normalized relations with Yugoslavia in 1971, and attempted trade agreements with other European nations, but was met with vocal disapproval by the United Kingdom and United States.
 1978 would become known as the "Year of Three Popes". In August, Paul VI, who had ruled since 1963, died. His successor was Cardinal Albino Luciano, who took the name John Paul. But only 33 days later, he was found dead, and the Catholic Church had to elect another pope. On October 16, Karol Wojtyła, a Polish cardinal, was elected, becoming Pope John Paul II. He was the first non-Italian pope since 1523.

Asia

 On September 17, 1978, the Camp David Accords were signed between Israel and Egypt. The Accords led directly to the 1979 Egypt–Israel peace treaty. They also resulted in Sadat and Begin sharing the 1978 Nobel Peace Prize.
 Major changes in the People's Republic of China. US president Richard Nixon visited the country in 1972 following visits by Henry Kissinger in 1971, restoring relations between the two countries, although formal diplomatic ties were not established until 1979. In 1976, Mao Zedong and Zhou Enlai both died, leading to the end of the Cultural Revolution and beginning a new era. After the brief rule of Mao's chosen successor Hua Guofeng, Deng Xiaoping emerged as China's paramount leader, and began to shift the country towards market economics and away from ideologically driven policies. In 1979, Deng Xiaoping visited the US.
 In 1971, the representatives of Chiang Kai-shek, then-President of the Republic of China (Taiwan), were expelled from the United Nations and replaced by the People's Republic of China. Chiang Kai-shek died in 1975, and in 1978 his son Chiang Ching-kuo became president, beginning a shift towards democratization in Taiwan. 
 In Iraq, Saddam Hussein began to rise to power by helping to modernize the country. One major initiative was removing the Western monopoly on oil, which later during the high prices of 1973 oil crisis would help Hussein's ambitious plans. On July 16, 1979, he assumed the presidency cementing his rise to power. His presidency led to the breaking off of a Syrian-Iraqi unification, which had been sought under his predecessor Ahmed Hassan al-Bakr and would lead to the Iran–Iraq War starting in the 1980s.
 Japan's economic growth surpassed the rest of the world in the 1970s, unseating the United States as the world's foremost industrial power.
 On April 17, 1975, the Khmer Rouge, led by Pol Pot, took over Cambodia's capital Phnom Penh.
From 1975 to 1979, the Khmer Rouge carried out the Cambodian genocide that killed nearly two million.
On April 13, 1975, the Lebanese Civil War began.
In 1978, Zia ul Haq came to power
In 1979, Zulfiqar Ali Bhutto was hanged in jail

Africa
 Idi Amin, President of Uganda from 1971 to 1979, after rising to power in a coup became infamous for his brutal dictatorship in Uganda. Amin's regime persecuted opposition to his rule and pursued a racist agenda of removing Asians from Uganda (particularly Indians who arrived in Uganda during British colonial rule). Amin initiated the Ugandan–Tanzanian War in 1978 in alliance with Libya based on an expansionist agenda to annex territory from Tanzania which resulted in Ugandan defeat and Amin's overthrow in 1979.
 South African activist Steve Biko died in 1977.
 Francisco Macías Nguema ruled Equatorial Guinea as a brutal dictator from 1969 until his overthrow and execution in 1979.
 Jean-Bédel Bokassa, who had ruled the Central African Republic since 1965, proclaimed himself Emperor Bokasa I and renamed his impoverished country the Central African Empire in 1977. He was overthrown two years later and went into exile.

Disasters

Natural disasters

 On January 5, 1970, the 7.1  Tonghai earthquake shakes Tonghai County, Yunnan, China, with a maximum Mercalli intensity of X (Extreme). Between 10,000 and 14,621 were killed and 26,783 were injured.
 On May 31, 1970, the 1970 Ancash earthquake caused a landslide that buried the town of Yungay, Peru; more than 47,000 people were killed.  "Essay on Super Cyclone in Orissa"
 The 1970 Bhola cyclone, a 120-mph (193 km/h) tropical cyclone, hit the densely populated Ganges Delta region of East Pakistan (now Bangladesh) on November 12 and 13, 1970, killing an estimated 500,000 people.  The storm remains to date the deadliest tropical cyclone in world history.
 On October 29, 1971, the 1971 Odisha cyclone in the Bay of Bengal, in the Indian state of Odisha, killed 10,000 people.
 June, 1972, Hurricane Agnes hit the east coast of the United States, resulting in 128 deaths and causing over $2.1 Billion in damage. 
 On April 3, 1974, the 1974 Super Outbreak occurred in the U.S. producing 148 tornadoes and killing a total of 330 people.
 On December 24, 1974, Cyclone Tracy devastated the Australian city of Darwin.
 Bangladesh famine of 1974 — Official records claim a death toll of 26,000. However, various sources claim about 1,000,000.
 On August 8, 1975, the Banqiao Dam, in China's Henan, failed after a freak typhoon; over 200,000 people perished.
 On February 4, 1976, a major earthquake in Guatemala and Honduras killed more than 22,000.
 On July 28, 1976, a 7.5 earthquake flattened Tangshan, China, killing 242,769 people and injuring 164,851.
 On August 17, 1976, a magnitude 8 earthquake struck Moro Gulf near the island of Sulu in Mindanao, Philippines causing a tsunami killing 5,000 to 8,000 people.
 Super Typhoon Tip affected areas in the southwestern Pacific Ocean from October 4–19, 1979.  Off the coast of Guam, Tip became the largest and most powerful tropical cyclone ever recorded, with a gale diameter of almost 1,400 miles, 190-mph winds, and a record intensity of 870 millibars.

Non-natural disasters
On October 2, 1970, there was a Plane Crash involving the Wichita State University Football Team
 On November 14, 1970, Southern Airways Flight 932 carrying the entire Marshall (West Virginia) football team and boosters crashed into a mountainside near Ceredo, West Virginia, on approach to Tri-State Airport in heavy rain and fog.  They were returning from a road game loss at East Carolina University in Greenville, North Carolina.  There were no survivors.
 On July 30, 1971, All Nippon Airways Flight 58 collided with a JASDF fighter plane, killing all 162 on board.  The JASDF pilot survived.
 On December 29, 1972, Eastern Air Lines Flight 401 crashed in the Florida Everglades while its crew was distracted.  101 people died in the accident while 75 survived.
 On January 22, 1973, an Alia Boeing 707, chartered by Nigeria Airways, crashed upon landing at Nigeria's Kano Airport after one of its landing gear struts collapsed.  176 of the 202 people on board perished, leaving 26 survivors.
 On March 3, 1974, Turkish Airlines Flight 981 crashed in northern France after a cargo hatch blowout, killing all 346 people aboard.
 On April 4, 1975, the rear loading ramp on a USAF Lockheed C-5 Galaxy blew open mid-flight, causing explosive decompression that crippled the aircraft.  153 were killed in the incident while 175 survived.
 On November 10, 1975, the U.S. Great Lakes bulk freighter SS Edmund Fitzgerald foundered on Lake Superior with the loss of all 29 crewmen.
 On September 10, 1976, in the Zagreb mid-air collision, a British Airways Hawker Siddeley Trident and an Inex-Adria Aviopromet Douglas DC-9 collided near Zagreb, Yugoslavia (now Croatia), killing all 176 aboard both planes and another person on the ground.
 On March 27, 1977, two Boeing 747s (a KLM and a Pan Am) collided on the runway in heavy fog at Los Rodeos Airport in Tenerife, Canary Islands, Spain, killing 583 people – the worst aviation disaster on record.
 On January 1, 1978, Air India Flight 855 crashed into sea off the coast of India, killing all 213 aboard.
 On September 25, 1978, PSA Flight 182 collided with a private Cessna 172 over San Diego, California, and crashed into a local neighborhood.  All 135 on the PSA aircraft, both pilots of the Cessna, and 7 people on the ground (144 total) were killed.
 On May 25, 1979, American Airlines Flight 191, outbound from O'Hare International Airport in Chicago, Illinois, lost an engine during take-off and crashed, killing all 271 on board and 2 others on the ground.  It was and remains the deadliest single-plane crash on American soil.
 On November 28, 1979, Air New Zealand Flight 901 crashed on the flanks of Mount Erebus in Antarctica, killing all 257 people on board.
 On March 28, 1979, there was a partial meltdown of the Three Mile Island Unit 2 reactor in Pennsylvania, United States. It is the most significant accident in U.S. commercial nuclear power plant history.

Worldwide trends
Superpower tensions had cooled by the 1970s, with the bellicose US–Soviet confrontations of the 1950s–60s giving way to the policy of "détente", which promoted the idea that the world's problems could be resolved at the negotiating table. Détente was partially a reaction against the policies of the previous 25 years, which had brought the world dangerously close to nuclear war on several occasions, and because the US was in a weakened position following the failure of the Vietnam War. As part of détente, the US also restored ties with the People's Republic of China, partially as a counterweight against Soviet expansionism.

The US–Soviet geopolitical rivalry nonetheless continued through the decade, although in a more indirect faction as the two superpowers jockeyed relentlessly for control of smaller countries. American and Soviet intelligence agencies gave funding, training, and material support to insurgent groups, governments, and armies across the globe, each seeking to gain a geopolitical advantage and install friendly governments. Coups, civil wars, and terrorism went on across Asia, Africa, and Latin America, and also in Europe where a spate of Soviet-backed Marxist terrorist groups were active throughout the decade. Over half the world's population in the 1970s lived under a repressive dictatorship. In 1979, a new wrinkle appeared in the form of Islamic fundamentalism, as the Shia theocracy of Ayatollah Khomeini overthrew the Shah of Iran and declared itself hostile to both Western democracy and godless communism.

People were deeply influenced by the rapid pace of societal change and the aspiration for a more egalitarian society in cultures that were long colonized and have an even longer history of hierarchical social structure.

The Green Revolution of the late 1960s brought about self-sufficiency in food in many developing economies. At the same time an increasing number of people began to seek urban prosperity over agrarian life. This consequently saw the duality of transition of diverse interaction across social communities amid increasing information blockade across social class.

Other common global ethos of the 1970s world included increasingly flexible and varied gender roles for women in industrialized societies. More women could enter the work force. However, the gender role of men remained as that of a breadwinner. The period also saw the socioeconomic effect of an ever-increasing number of women entering the non-agrarian economic workforce. The Iranian revolution also affected global attitudes to and among those of the Muslim faith toward the end of the 1970s.

The global experience of the cultural transition of the 1970s and an experience of a global zeitgeist revealed the interdependence of economies since World War II, in a world increasingly polarized between the United States and the Soviet Union.

Assassinations and attempts
Prominent assassinations, targeted killings, and assassination attempts include:

Economy

The 1970s were perhaps the worst decade of most industrialized countries' economic performance since the Great Depression. Although there was no severe economic depression as witnessed in the 1930s, economic growth rates were considerably lower than previous decades. As a result, the 1970s adversely distinguished itself from the prosperous postwar period between 1945 and 1973. The oil shocks of 1973 and 1979 added to the existing ailments and conjured high inflation throughout much of the world for the rest of the decade. U.S. manufacturing industries began to decline as a result, with the United States running its last trade surplus in 1975. In contrast, Japan and West Germany experienced economic booms and started overtaking the U.S. as the world's leading manufacturers. In 1970, Japan overtook West Germany to become the world's second-largest economy. Japan would rank as the world's second-largest economy until 1994 when the European Economic Area (18 countries under a single market) came into effect.

In the US, the average annual inflation rate from 1900 to 1970 was approximately 2.5%. From 1970 to 1979, however, the average rate was 7.06%, and topped out at 13.29% in December 1979. This period is also known for "stagflation", a phenomenon in which inflation and unemployment steadily increased. It led to double-digit interest rates that rose to unprecedented levels (above 12% per year). The prime rate hit 21.5 in December 1980, the highest in history. A rising cost of housing was reflected in the average price of a new home in the U.S. The average price of a new home in the U.S. was $23,450 in 1970 up to $68,700 by 1980. By the time of 1980, when U.S. President Jimmy Carter was running for re-election against Ronald Reagan, the misery index (the sum of the unemployment rate and the inflation rate) had reached an all-time high of 21.98%. The economic problems of the 1970s would result in a sluggish cynicism replacing the optimistic attitudes of the 1950s and 1960s and a distrust of government and technology. Faith in government was at an all-time low in the aftermath of Vietnam and Watergate, as exemplified by the low voter turnout in the 1976 United States presidential election.
There was also the 1973–74 stock market crash.

Great Britain also experienced considerable economic turmoil during the decade as outdated industries proved unable to compete with Japanese and German wares. Labor strikes happened with such frequency as to almost paralyze the country's infrastructure. Following the Winter of Discontent, Margaret Thatcher was elected prime minister in 1979 with the purpose of implementing extreme economic reforms.

In Eastern Europe, Soviet-style command economies began showing signs of stagnation, in which successes were persistently dogged by setbacks. The oil shock increased East European, particularly Soviet, exports, but a growing inability to increase agricultural output caused growing concern to the governments of the COMECON block, and a growing dependence on food imported from democratic nations.

On the other hand, export-driven economic development in Asia, especially by the Four Asian Tigers (Hong Kong, South Korea, Singapore, and Taiwan), resulted in rapid economic transformation and industrialization. Their abundance of cheap labor, combined with educational and other policy reforms, set the foundation for development in the region during the 1970s and beyond.

Oil crisis
Economically, the 1970s were marked by the energy crisis which peaked in 1973 and 1979 (see 1973 oil crisis and 1979 oil crisis). After the first oil shock in 1973, gasoline was rationed in many countries. Europe particularly depended on the Middle East for oil; the United States was also affected even though it had its own oil reserves. Many European countries introduced car-free days and weekends. In the United States, customers with a license plate ending in an odd number were only allowed to buy gasoline on odd-numbered days, while even-numbered plate-holders could only purchase gasoline on even-numbered days. The realization that oil reserves were not endless and technological development was not sustainable without potentially harming the environment ended the belief in limitless progress that had existed since the 19th century. As a result, ecological awareness rose substantially, which had a major effect on the economy.

Science and technology

Science
The 1970s witnessed an explosion in the understanding of solid-state physics, driven by the development of the integrated circuit, and the laser. Stephen Hawking developed his theories of black holes and the boundary-condition of the universe at this period with his theory called Hawking radiation. The biological sciences greatly advanced, with molecular biology, bacteriology, virology, and genetics achieving their modern forms in this decade. Biodiversity became a cause of major concern as habitat destruction, and Stephen Jay Gould's theory of punctuated equilibrium revolutionized evolutionary thought.

Space exploration
As the 1960s ended, the United States had made two successful crewed lunar landings. Many Americans lost interest afterward, feeling that since the country had accomplished President John F. Kennedy's goal of landing on the Moon by the end of the 1960s, there was no need for further missions. There was also a growing sentiment that the billions of dollars spent on the space program should be put to other uses. The Moon landings continued through 1972, but the near loss of the Apollo 13 mission in April 1970 served to further anti-NASA feelings. Plans for missions up to Apollo 20 were canceled, and the remaining Apollo and Saturn hardware was used for the Skylab space station program in 1973–1974, and for the Apollo–Soyuz Test Project (ASTP), which was carried out in July 1975. Many of the ambitious projects NASA had planned for the 1970s were canceled amid heavy budget cutbacks, and instead it would devote most of the decade to the development of the Space Shuttle. ASTP was the last crewed American space flight for the next five years. The year 1979 witnessed the spectacular reentry of Skylab over Australia. NASA had planned for a Shuttle mission to the space station, but the shuttles were not ready to fly until 1981, too late to save it.

Meanwhile, the Soviets, having failed in their attempt at crewed lunar landings, canceled the program in 1972. By then, however, they had already begun Salyut, the world's first space station program, which began in 1971. This would have problems of its own, especially the tragic loss of the Soyuz 11 crew in July 1971 and the near-loss of the Soyuz 18a crew during launch in April 1975. It eventually proved a success, with missions as long as six months being conducted by the end of the decade.

In terms of unmanned missions, a variety of lunar and planetary probes were launched by the US and Soviet programs during the decade. The most successful of these include the Soviet Lunokhod program, a series of robotic lunar missions which included the first unmanned sample return from another world, and the American Voyagers, which took advantage of a rare alignment of the outer planets to visit all of them except Pluto by the end of the 1980s.

China entered the space race in 1970 with the launching of its first satellite, but technological backwardness and limited funds would prevent the country from becoming a significant force in space exploration. Japan launched a satellite for the first time in 1972. The European Space Agency was founded during the decade as well.

Biology
 The second generation of face lifts were first attempted in the 1970s, popularizing the procedure for millions.
 The first MRI image was published in 1973.
 César Milstein and Georges Köhler reported their discovery of how to use hybridoma cells to isolate monoclonal antibodies, effectively beginning the history of monoclonal antibody use in science.
 Carl Woese and George E. Fox classified archaea as a new, separate domain of life.
"Lucy", a fossilized hominid of the species Australopithecus afarensis, was discovered in the Afar region of Ethiopia by Donald Johanson in 1974, providing evidence for bipedalism as an early occurrence in human evolution.
 After successful vaccination campaigns throughout the 19th and 20th centuries, the WHO certified the eradication of smallpox in December 1979 after the last smallpox case in 1977.
 The first organisms genetically engineered were bacteria in 1973 and then mice in 1974.
1977 The first complete DNA genome to be sequenced is that of bacteriophage φX174.
In 1978, Louise Brown became the first child to be born via in vitro fertilisation, or IVF.

Social science
Social science intersected with hard science in the works in natural language processing by Terry Winograd (1973) and the establishment of the first cognitive sciences department in the world at MIT in 1979. The fields of generative linguistics and cognitive psychology went through a renewed vigor with symbolic modeling of semantic knowledge while the final devastation of the long-standing tradition of behaviorism came about through the severe criticism of B. F. Skinner's work in 1971 by the cognitive scientist Noam Chomsky.

Technology

Concorde makes the world's first commercial passenger-carrying supersonic flight.

Electronics and communications
The birth of modern computing was in the 1970s, which saw the development of:
 Intel 4004, the world's first general microprocessor
 the C programming language
 rudimentary personal computers, with the launch of the Datapoint 2200
 pocket calculators
 the Magnavox Odyssey, the first home video game console
 the Sony Walkman, built in 1978 by Japanese audio-division engineer Nobutoshi Kihara
 consumer video games, after the release of Computer Space
 the earliest floppy disks, invented at IBM, which were 8 inches wide and long, commercially available by 1971
 email, with the first transmission in 1971
 electronic paper, developed by Nick Sheridon at Xerox's Palo Alto Research Center (PARC)
 the Xerox Alto of 1973, the first computer to use the desktop metaphor and mouse-driven graphical user interface (GUI)

The 1970s were also the start of:
 fiber optics, which transformed the communications industry
 microwave ovens, which became commercially available
 Betamax and VHS VCRs which became commercially available and especially VHS would become widely used for home entertainment in the 1980s and 1990s.
 the first voicemail system, known as the Speech Filing System (SFS), invented by Stephen J. Boies in 1973
 e-commerce, invented in 1979 by Michael Aldrich
 DiscoVision in 1978, the first commercial optical disc storage medium
 positron emission tomography, invented in 1972 by Edward J. Hoffman and fellow scientist Michael Phelps
 cell phones, with the first call transmitted in 1973, Martin Cooper of Motorola
 car phone services, first available in Finland in 1971 in form of the zero-generation ARP (Autoradiopuhelin, or Car Radiophone) service
 Apple Computer Company, founded in 1976 and incorporated the following year by Steve Jobs and Steve Wozniak

Rail
British Rail introduced high-speed trains on InterCity services. The trains consisted of British Rail Class 43 diesel-electric locomotives at either end with British Rail Mark 3 carriages. The trains were built in the United Kingdom by British Rail Engineering Limited. The high speed trains ran at  speeding up journeys between towns and cities and is still known as the InterCity 125.

Amtrak was formed in the United States in 1971, assuming responsibility for inter-city passenger operations throughout the country. In 1976, Conrail was formed to take over assets of six bankrupt freight railroads in the northeastern US.

Automobiles

The 1970s was an era of fuel price increases, rising insurance rates, safety concerns, and emissions controls. The 1973 oil crisis caused a move towards smaller, fuel-efficient vehicles. Attempts were made to produce electric cars, but they were largely unsuccessful. In the United States, imported cars became a significant factor for the first time, and several domestic-built subcompact models entered the market. American-made cars such as the "quirky" AMC Gremlin, the jelly bean shaped AMC Pacer, and Pontiac Firebird's powerful Trans Am "sum up" the decade. Muscle cars and convertible models faded from favor during the early-1970s. It was believed that the 1976 Cadillac Eldorado would be the last American-built convertible; ending the open body style that once dominated the auto industry.

Cars in the U.S. from the early 1970s are noted more for their power than their styling, but they even lost their power by Malaise era of the late-1970s. Styling on American cars became progressively more boxy and rectilinear during the 1970s, with coupes being the most popular body style. Wood paneling and shag carpets dominated the interiors. Many automobiles began to lose their character and looked the same across brands and automakers, as well as featuring "luxury" enhancements such as vinyl roofs and opera windows. Only a few had "real personalities" such as the AMC Gremlin, which was America's first modern subcompact, and the AMC Pacer. "These two cars embody a sense of artful desperation that made them stand out from the crowd and epitomize at once the best and worst of the seventies."

Automobiles in the U.S. reached the largest sizes they would ever attain, but by 1977, General Motors managed to downsize its full-size models to more manageable dimensions. Ford followed suit two years later, with Chrysler offering new small front-wheel-drive models, but was suffering from a worsening financial situation caused by various factors. By 1979, the company was near bankruptcy, and under its new president Lee Iacocca (who had been fired from Ford the year before), asked for a government bailout. American Motors beat out the U.S. Big Three to subcompact sized model (the Gremlin) in 1970, but its fortunes declined throughout the decade, forcing it into a partnership with the French automaker Renault in 1979.

European car design underwent major changes during the 1970s due to the need for performance with high fuel efficiency—designs such as the Volkswagen Golf and Passat, BMW 3, 5, and 7 series, and Mercedes-Benz S-Class appeared at the latter half of the decade. Ford Europe, specifically Ford Germany, also eclipsed the profits of its American parent company. The designs of Giorgetto Giugiaro became dominant, along with those of Marcello Gandini in Italy. The 1970s also saw the decline and practical failure of the British car industry—a combination of militant strikes and poor quality control effectively halted development at British Leyland, owner of all other British car companies during the 1970s.

The Japanese automobile industry flourished during the 1970s, compared to other major auto markets. Japanese vehicles became internationally renowned for their affordability, reliability, and fuel-efficiency, which was very important to many customers after the oil crisis of 1973. Japanese car manufacturing focused on computerized robotic manufacturing techniques and lean manufacturing, contributing to high-efficiency and low production costs. The Honda Civic was introduced in 1973, and sold well due to its high fuel-efficiency. By 1975 Toyota overtook Volkswagen as the top-selling imported automobile brand in the U.S., with over a million cars sold per year by this point. Other popular compact cars included the Toyota Corolla and the Datsun Sunny, in addition to other cars from those companies and others such as Subaru, Mitsubishi, and Mazda.

Society

Role of women in society

The role of women in society was profoundly altered with growing feminism across the world and with the presence and rise of a significant number of women as heads of state outside monarchies and heads of government in a number of countries across the world during the 1970s, many being the first women to hold such positions. Non-monarch women heads of state and heads of government in this period included Isabel Perón as the first woman President in Argentina and the first woman non-monarch head of state in the Western hemisphere in 1974 until being deposed in 1976, Elisabeth Domitien becomes the first woman Prime Minister of the Central African Republic, Indira Gandhi continuing as Prime Minister of India until 1977 (and taking office again in 1980), Sirimavo Bandaranaike, Prime minister of Sri Lanka (Former Ceylon) and first female head of government in the world, re-elected in 1970, Prime Minister Golda Meir of Israel and acting chairman Soong Ching-ling of the People's Republic of China continuing their leadership from the sixties, Lidia Gueiler Tejada becoming the interim President of Bolivia beginning from 1979 to 1980, Maria de Lourdes Pintasilgo becoming the first woman Prime Minister of Portugal in 1979, and Margaret Thatcher becoming the first woman Prime Minister of the United Kingdom in 1979. Both Indira Gandhi and Margaret Thatcher would remain important political figures in the following decade in the 1980s.

Pope Paul VI recognized the popularity of Catholic feminists, but ultimately held to tradition when it came to leaving bishops, priests, and deacons a male-only position.

Social movements

Anti-war protests

The opposition to the War in Vietnam that began in the 1960s grew exponentially during the early 1970s. One of the best-known anti-war demonstrations was the Kent State shootings. In 1970, university students were protesting the war and the draft. Riots ensued during the weekend and the National Guard was called in to maintain the peace. However, by 4 May 1970, tensions arose again, and as the crowd grew larger, the National Guard started shooting. Four students were killed and nine injured. This event caused disbelief and shock throughout the country and became a staple of anti-Vietnam demonstrations.

Environmentalism
The 1970s started a mainstream affirmation of the environmental issues early activists from the 1960s, such as Rachel Carson and Murray Bookchin, had warned of. The Apollo 11 mission, which had occurred at the end of the previous decade, had transmitted back concrete images of the Earth as an integrated, life-supporting system and shaped a public willingness to preserve nature. On April 22, 1970, the United States celebrated its first Earth Day, in which over two thousand colleges and universities and roughly ten thousand primary and secondary schools participated.

Sexual Revolution

The 1960s counterculture movement had rapidly undone many existing social taboos, and divorce, extramarital sex, and homosexuality were increasingly accepted in the Western world. The event of legalized abortion and over-the-counter birth control pills also played a major factor. Western Europe was in some ways more progressive on sexual liberation than the United States, as nudity in film and on TV had been gradually accepted there from the mid-1960s, and many European countries during this time began allowing women to go topless in public places. Nudist culture was also popular during the decade, especially in Germany and Scandinavia. Child erotica found a niche market, but would eventually be banned under child pornography laws in the 1980s to 1990s.

The market for adult entertainment in the 1970s was large, and driven in part by the sizable baby boomer population, and the 1972 movie Behind the Green Door, an X-rated feature, became one of the top-grossing films of the year. Playboy Magazine appeared increasingly dull and old-fashioned next to new, more explicit sex-themed magazines such as Penthouse Magazine and Hustler Magazine.

By the end of the decade, there was an increasing backlash against libertine sexual attitudes, and the event of the AIDS epidemic helped bring about an end to the Sexual Revolution. Adult movie theaters, which had exploded in numbers during the 1970s and were widely seen as a symptom of urban decay in the US, declined as pornographic movies would largely shift to VHS tapes during the succeeding decade.

Crime and urban decay
Crime rates in the US had been low from the 1940s until the mid-1960s, but began to escalate after 1965 due to a complex of social, economic, and demographic factors. By the 1970s, crime and blighted urban areas were a serious cause of concern, New York City being particularly affected. In 1972, the US Supreme Court ruled capital punishment unconstitutional, then reversed the ruling only four years later.

Feminism

The Second-Wave Feminist Movement in the United States, which had begun in the 1960s, carried over to the 1970s, and took a prominent role within society. The fiftieth anniversary of the passage of the Nineteenth Amendment to the United States Constitution (which legalized female suffrage) in 1970 was commemorated by the Women's Strike for Equality and other protests.

1971 saw Erin Pizzey establish the world's first domestic violence shelter in Chiswick, London and Pizzey and her colleagues opened further facilities throughout the next few years. This work inspired similar networks of safe houses for female victims of abuse in other countries, with the first shelter in continental Europe opening in Amsterdam in 1974.

With the anthology Sisterhood is Powerful and other works, such as Sexual Politics, being published at the start of the decade, feminism started to reach a larger audience than ever before.  In addition, the Supreme Court's 1973 decision of Roe v. Wade, which constitutionalized the right to an abortion, brought the women's rights movement into the national political spotlight.

Gloria Steinem, Betty Friedan, Betty Ford, Shirley Chisholm, Bella Abzug, Robin Morgan, Kate Millet and Elizabeth Holtzman, among many others, led the movement for women's equality.

Even musically, the women's movement had its shining moment.  Australian-American singer Helen Reddy, recorded the song "I Am Woman", which became an anthem for the women's liberation movement. "I Am Woman" reached No. 1 on the Billboard Hot 100 chart and even won Helen her one and only Grammy Award.

Another movement to arise was the 1970s Goddess movement, which took place to combat patriarchal ideas of religion.

Most efforts of the movement, especially aims at social equality and repeal of the remaining oppressive, sexist laws, were successful. Doors of opportunity were more numerous and much further open than before as women gained unheard of success in business, politics, education, science, the law, and even the home. Although most aims of the movement were successful, however, there were some significant failures, most notably the failure to ratify the Equal Rights Amendment to the U.S. Constitution with only three more states needed to ratify it (efforts to ratify ERA in the unratified states continues to this day and twenty-two states have adopted state ERAs). Also, the wage gap failed to close, but it did become smaller.

The second wave feminist movement in the United States largely ended in 1982 with the failure of the Equal Rights Amendment, and with new conservative leadership in Washington, D.C..  American women created a brief, but powerful, third-wave in the early 1990s which addressed sexual harassment (inspired by the Anita Hill–Clarence Thomas Senate Judiciary Committee hearings of 1991). The results of the movement included a new awareness of such issues among women, and unprecedented numbers of women elected to public office, particularly the United States Senate.

Civil rights
The Civil Rights Movement of the 1960s began to fracture in the 1970s, as social groups began defining themselves more by their differences than by their universalities. The Black Nationalist movement grew out of frustrations with the "non-violent" strategies of earlier Civil Rights Activists. With the April 1968 assassination of Martin Luther King Jr. and June 1968 assassination of Robert F. Kennedy, many Black people were compelled to reject ideas of negotiation and instead embrace isolation. The feminist movement also splintered from a larger push for Civil Rights in the 1970s. The seventies were seen as the "woman's turn", though many feminists incorporated civil rights ideals into their movement. A feminist who had inherited the leadership position of the civil rights movement from her husband, Coretta Scott King, as leader of the black movement, called for an end to all discrimination, helping and encouraging the Woman's Liberation movement, and other movements as well. At the National Women's Conference in 1977 a minority women's resolution, promoted by King and others, passed to ensure racial equality in the movement's goals. Similarly, the gay movement made a huge step forward in the 1970s with the election of political figures such as Harvey Milk to public office and the advocating of anti-gay discrimination legislation passed and not passed during the decade. Many celebrities, including Freddie Mercury and Andy Warhol, also "came out" during this decade, bringing gay culture further into the limelight.

Youth suffrage

The Twenty-sixth Amendment to the United States Constitution was ratified on July 1, 1971, lowering the voting age for all federal and state elections from 21 years to 18 years. The primary impetus for this change was the fact that young men were being drafted to fight in the Vietnam War before they were old enough to vote.

Popular culture
The most prominent events and trends in popular culture of the decade (particularly in the Anglosphere) include:

Music

During the early 1970s, popular music continued to be dominated by musicians who had achieved fame during the 1950s and the 1960s such as the Rolling Stones, The Who, Elvis Presley, Johnny Cash, Loretta Lynn, Conway Twitty, Bob Dylan, The Grateful Dead, and Eric Clapton. In addition, many newcomer rock groups such as Black Sabbath and Led Zeppelin appeared. The Beatles disbanded in 1970, but each member of the band immediately released a highly successful solo album, and Paul McCartney especially would remain extremely popular throughout the decade. Singer-songwriters such as Elton John, James Taylor and Jackson Browne also came into vogue during the early 1970s.

The 1970s saw the rapid commercialization of rock music, and by mid-decade there were a spate of bands derisively dubbed "corporate rock" due to the notion that they had been created by record labels to produce simplistic, radio-friendly songs that offered clichés rather than meaningful lyrics. Such bands included The Doobie Brothers, Bread, Styx, Kansas, and REO Speedwagon.

Funk, an offshoot of soul music with a greater emphasis on beats, and influences from rhythm and blues, jazz, and psychedelic rock, was also very popular. The mid-1970s also saw the rise of disco music, which dominated during the last half of the decade with bands like the Bee Gees, Chic, ABBA, Village People, Boney M, Donna Summer, KC and the Sunshine Band, and others. In response to this, rock music became increasingly hard-edged, with early metal artists like Led Zeppelin, Jimi Hendrix, Black Sabbath, and Deep Purple. Minimalism also emerged, led by composers such as Philip Glass, Steve Reich and Michael Nyman. This was a break from the intellectual serial music in the tradition of Schoenberg, which lasted from the early 1900s to 1960s.

The 1970s also saw artists from Motown records become popular across the globe. Artists like the Jackson 5, Stevie Wonder and Marvin Gaye dominated the record charts across the world and had a significant influence on pop culture, including breaking down racial barriers.

Classical and experimental music influenced both art rock and progressive rock genres with bands such as Pink Floyd, Yes, Todd Rundgren's Utopia, Supertramp, Rush, Genesis, King Crimson, Emerson, Lake & Palmer, Jethro Tull, The Moody Blues and Soft Machine. Hard rock and Heavy metal also emerged among British bands Led Zeppelin, Queen, The Who, Black Sabbath, UFO, Deep Purple, Uriah Heep, and Judas Priest.
Australian band AC/DC also found its hard-rock origins in the early 1970s and its breakthrough in 1979's Highway to Hell, while popular American rock bands included Aerosmith, Lynyrd Skynyrd and shock rockers Alice Cooper, Blue Öyster Cult, and Kiss, and guitar-oriented Ted Nugent and Van Halen. In Europe, there was a surge of popularity in the early decade for glam rock.

After a successful return to live performing in the late 60s with his TV special, Elvis Presley remained popular in Vegas and on concert tours throughout the United States until his death in 1977. His 1973 televised concert, Aloha from Hawaii Via Satellite, aired in over 40 countries in Europe and Asia, as well as the United States, making it one of the most popular concert events of the decade.

The second half of the decade saw the rise of punk rock, when a spate of fresh, young rock groups playing stripped-down hard rock came to prominence at a time when most of the artists associated with the 1960s to early 1970s were in creative decline. Punk bands included The Sex Pistols, The Clash, The Ramones, The Talking Heads, and more.

The highest-selling album of the decade was Pink Floyd's The Dark Side of the Moon (1973), along with Eagles' Hotel California (1976) and Fleetwood Mac's Rumours (1977). Dark Side of the Moon remained on the Billboard 200 albums chart for 741 weeks. Electronic instrumental progressive rock was particularly significant in continental Europe, allowing bands like Kraftwerk, Tangerine Dream, Can, and Faust to circumvent the language barrier. Their synthesiser-heavy "krautrock", along with the work of Brian Eno (for a time the keyboard player with Roxy Music), would be a major influence on subsequent synthrock. The mid-1970s saw the rise of electronic art music musicians such as Jean-Michel Jarre, Vangelis, and Tomita, who with Brian Eno were a significant influence of the development of new-age music. Japanese band Yellow Magic Orchestra helped to pioneer synthpop, with their self-titled album (in 1978) setting a template with less minimalism and with a strong emphasis on melody, and drawing from a wider range of influences than had been employed by Kraftwerk. YMO also introduced the microprocessor-based Roland MC-8 sequencer and TR-808 rhythm machine to popular music.

In the first half of the 1970s, many jazz musicians from the Miles Davis school achieved cross-over success through jazz-rock fusion with bands like Weather Report, Return to Forever, The Headhunters and The Mahavishnu Orchestra who also influenced this genre and many others. In Germany, Manfred Eicher started the ECM label, which quickly made a name for "chamber jazz". Towards the end of the decade, Jamaican reggae music, already popular in the Caribbean and Africa since the early 1970s, became very popular in the U.S. and in Europe, mostly because of reggae superstar and legend Bob Marley. The mid-1970s saw the reemergence of acoustic jazz with the return of artists like Dexter Gordon to the US music scene, who, along with a number of other artists, such as trumpet innovators like Don Ellis and Woody Shaw, who were among the last of the decade's traditionally-oriented acoustic jazz musicians to be signed to major record labels, to receive critical and widespread commercial recognition and multiple Grammy nominations.

The late 1970s also saw the beginning of hip hop music with disc jockeys like DJ Kool Herc and Afrika Bambaataa taking loops from funk and soul records and play them repeatedly at block parties and dance clubs. At the end of the 1970s, popular songs like "Rapper's Delight" by Sugarhill Gang gave hip hop a wider audience. Hip hop was also influenced by the song "The Revolution Will Not Be Televised" by Gil Scott-Heron.

Country music also continued to increase in popularity in the 1970s. Between 1977 and 1979, it became more mainstream, particularly with the outlaw movement, led by Waylon Jennings and Willie Nelson. The 70s also saw the rise of a country music subgenre, southern rock, led by the Allman Brothers Band. Other artists; such as Conway Twitty, Loretta Lynn, Don Williams, Kenny Rogers, Dolly Parton, Ronnie Milsap, Crystal Gayle, and Barbara Mandrell; all scored hits throughout the 70s which reached both country and pop charts. The genre also saw its golden age of vocal duos and groups in this decade; with Conway Twitty and Loretta Lynn, George Jones and Tammy Wynette, Jim Ed Brown and Helen Cornelius, the Bellamy Brothers, the Oak Ridge Boys, the Statler Brothers, Dave & Sugar, and The Kendalls. The genre also became more involved in Hollywood toward the end of the decade, with country-themed action films such as Smokey and the Bandit and Every Which Way But Loose, a trend that continued into the early 80s with Urban Cowboy and Bronco Billy.

A major event in music in the early 1970s was the deaths of popular rock stars Jimi Hendrix, Janis Joplin, and Jim Morrison, all at the age of 27.  Two of popular music's most successful artists from other eras died within eight weeks of each other in 1977. Elvis Presley, the best-selling singer of all time, died on August 16, 1977. Presley's funeral was held at Graceland, on Thursday, August 18, 1977. Bing Crosby, who sold about 50 million records, died on October 14, 1977. His single, White Christmas, remains as the best selling single of all time, confirmed by the Guinness Records.

In addition to the deaths in the 1970s, breakups of bands and duos; such as the Beatles, Simon and Garfunkel, Creedence Clearwater Revival, the Everly Brothers, and others; occurred over the course of the decade.

Statistically, Led Zeppelin and Elton John were the most successful musical acts of the 1970s, both having sold more than 300 million records since 1969.

Film

Oscar winners of the decade were Patton (1970), The French Connection (1971), The Godfather (1972), The Sting (1973), The Godfather Part II (1974), One Flew Over the Cuckoo's Nest (1975), Rocky (1976), Annie Hall (1977), The Deer Hunter (1978), and Kramer vs. Kramer (1979).

The top ten highest-grossing films of the decade are (in order from highest to lowest grossing): Star Wars, Jaws, Grease, The Exorcist, Close Encounters of the Third Kind, Superman, The Godfather, Saturday Night Fever, Rocky, and Jaws 2. Two of these movies came out on the same day: June 16, 1978.

In 1970s European cinema, the failure of the Prague Spring brought about nostalgic motion pictures such as István Szabó's Szerelmesfilm (1970). German New Wave and Rainer Fassbinder's existential movies characterized film-making in Germany. The movies of the Swedish director Ingmar Bergman reached a new level of expression in motion pictures like Cries and Whispers (1973).

Airport was released in 1970, spawning the air disaster film genre. Throughout the decade, the film inspired three sequels: Airport 1975, Airport '77, and The Concorde: Airport '79. The genre also inspired a spoof film (Airplane!) along with its two sequels in the early 1980s. A slew of other air disaster films followed suit throughout the 1980s and well into the 1990s, primarily in made-for-TV movies.

Car chase movies also became a popular film genre of the 1970s with such films as Dirty Mary, Crazy Larry in 1974, and perhaps the genre's most popular film Smokey and the Bandit in 1977.

Asian cinema of the 1970s catered to the rising middle class fantasies and struggles. In the Bollywood cinema of India, this was epitomized by the movies of Bollywood superhero Amitabh Bachchan. Another Asian touchstone beginning in the early 1970s was Hong Kong martial arts film which sparked a greater interest in Chinese martial arts around the world. Martial arts film reached the peak of its popularity largely in part due to its greatest icon, Bruce Lee.
During the 1970s, Hollywood continued the New Hollywood movement of the late-1960s with young filmmakers like Francis Ford Coppola, George Lucas, Martin Scorsese and Steven Spielberg, as well as films like Apocalypse Now, The Godfather, Star Wars, Taxi Driver, Jaws, and Close Encounters of the Third Kind. Top-grossing Jaws (1975) ushered in the blockbuster era of filmmaking, though it was eclipsed two years later by the science-fiction film Star Wars (1977). Saturday Night Fever (1977) single-handedly touched off disco mania in the U.S. The Godfather (1972) was also one of the decade's greatest successes and its first follow-up, The Godfather Part II (1974) was also successful for a sequel.

The Rocky Horror Picture Show flopped in its 1975 debut, only to reappear as a more-popular midnight show later in the decade. Still in limited release decades after its premiere, it is the longest-running theatrical release in film history.

The Exorcist (1973) was a box office success for the horror genre, inspiring many other so-called "devil (Satan)" films like The Omen and both of their own sequels. The release of the movie followed a general mood of paranoia on satanic themes in the United States; also the counterculture of the 1970s saw an increasing interest in occultism.

All That Jazz (1979) gained high critical praise, winning four Oscars and several other awards. It was an inductee of the 2001 National Film Registry list.

The Golden Age of Porn continued its reign throughout the 1970s, with one of its most popular films of the decade being Debbie Does Dallas in 1978.

Television

United Kingdom
In the United Kingdom, colour channels were now available; three stations had begun broadcasting in colour between 1967 and 1969. However, many viewers continued to watch black-and-white television sets for most of the decade, which meant for example that televised snooker (in which the colour of balls is important) did not reach the heights of its popularity until the 1980s.

Notable dramas included Play for Today and Pennies from Heaven. In police dramas, there was a move towards increasing realism; popular shows included Dixon of Dock Green, Z-Cars, Softly, Softly, and The Sweeney.

The science fiction show Doctor Who reached its peak.

1970s UK television featured a mix of traditional and more modern comedy. Morecambe and Wise, The Benny Hill Show, Are You Being Served? and Dad's Army had their origins in the variety show and radio comedy of the first half of the century. Many popular British situation comedies (sit-coms) were gentle, unchallenging comedies of middle-class life; typical examples were Terry and June and Sykes. However, the middle-class settings of The Good Life and The Fall and Rise of Reginald Perrin contrasted with their anti-establishment theme of people rejecting traditional social norms. A harsher side of society was shown by comedy series like Porridge and Rising Damp, while sitcoms such as Mind Your Language, Love Thy Neighbour and Till Death Us Do Part reflected social unease brought about by post-war immigration. Spike Milligan's Q and the still-popular Monty Python's Flying Circus both used surreal comedy, originating from the 1950s The Goon Show.

The television information retrieval service Teletext was initially introduced when the BBC Ceefax system went live on 23 September 1974.

In the late 1970s, BBC2's unveiled a new identity, a twin-striped "2", which was the first electronically generated symbol and scrolled on and off the screen.

United States

As the 1970s began, the Big Three TV networks were rapidly re-engineering their lineups, noting that existing programs were not attracting the youth audience. Most existing programs still operated on paradigms established in the 1950s, and some shows had literally been on the air since the dawn of TV broadcasting in the late 1940s and early 1950s. Shows that had low ratings or insufficient youth appeal were cancelled as networks scrambled to attract the large baby boomer audience.

To reflect the new social trends, television changed dramatically with more urban and edgy settings, and replaced the popular rural/country wholesome look of the 1950s and 1960s, seen as outmoded and unable to connect with young, educated urban audiences. This particular trend was known as the rural purge. Television was transformed by what became termed as "social consciousness" programming, such as All in the Family and Soap, which broke down television barriers. Many advertising trends of the 1970s also reflected this growing social consciousness trend, such as with Coca-Cola's "Give the World a Coke" and McDonalds "You Deserve a Break" campaigns.

The women's movement ushered in a slew of programming featuring strong, independent females as central characters. Most notable was The Mary Tyler Moore Show, which spawned the successful spin-offs Rhoda and Phyllis, and also resulted in Mary Tyler Moore becoming the first female to head a television production company of her own, MTM Enterprises, which churned out groundbreaking programming in the late 1970s throughout the 1990s. Women were also established portraying action characters in programs like Police Woman, Wonder Woman, The Bionic Woman, and others.

Minority-centric television programming also featured prominently during the 1970s. Shows featuring African-Americans as main characters, such as Sanford and Son, Maude, The Jeffersons, Good Times, and What's Happening!! broke down barriers and became very popular. In addition, Soul Train, the brainchild of Don Cornelius, premiered in 1971 as the African-American counterpart to American Bandstand, giving a forum for soul, funk, jazz, R&B, disco, and future rap and hip hop artists to gain exposure to American audiences, consumers, music lovers, enthusiasts, and those keen on learning new dance moves.

The television western, which had been very popular in the 1950s and 1960s, all but died out during the 1970s, with Bonanza, The Virginian, and Gunsmoke ending their runs. Replacing westerns were police and detective shows, a trend that would last through the 1980s.

Television still had its medical shows of the 1970s, however, Emergency! was the first popular medical drama ever to feature both the paramedic program as well as the hospital emergency department, which also encouraged future people in the United States to develop their own paramedic program or hospital emergency department, and acted as an inspiration for many individuals. Marcus Welby, M.D. and Medical Center were other long-running medical dramas popular during the 1970s.

1950s nostalgia became a theme in prime time sitcoms with the Garry Marshall-produced Happy Days and its two spin-offs Laverne & Shirley and Mork & Mindy.

By the mid-to-late 1970s, "jiggle television"—programs oriented toward sexual gratification and farce comedy and situations—became popular.  Such programs included Charlie's Angels, The Love Boat, and perhaps the genre's most popular, Three's Company.

Soap operas expanded their audiences beyond housewives with the rise of All My Children, As the World Turns, Somerset, and The Young and the Restless; with many extending their episodes from 30 minutes to an hour. The soap Another World began a 16-month experiment in March 1979 by screening 90-minute episodes, the only serial to do so.

Game shows such as Match Game, The Hollywood Squares, Family Feud, and many others saw its golden age on daytime television. The height of Match Games popularity occurred between 1973 and 1977, before it was overtaken by Family Feud in 1978. Television's current longest-running game show, The Price Is Right, began its run hosted by Bob Barker in 1972.

Another influential genre was the television newscast, which built on its initial widespread success in the 1960s.

The science fiction phenomenon of the late 1970s that began with Star Wars went to television with shows such as Battlestar Galactica.

Variety shows, a staple of TV programming since the beginning, were also re-engineered to appeal to young viewers. Old standbys such as The Ed Sullivan Show and The Red Skelton Show were canceled and replaced by hipper programming like Sonny and Cher Comedy Hour and Donny & Marie. The Carol Burnett Show also ended its historic 11-year run in 1978. In the end, rising production costs largely did in variety shows. The exception was Saturday Night Live (then known as NBC's Saturday Night), which was created by Lorne Michaels and premiered in 1975, with an original cast of Laraine Newman, John Belushi, Jane Curtin, Gilda Radner, Dan Aykroyd, Garrett Morris, and Chevy Chase.

Pay television
As cable television became more affordable and accessible by U.S. consumers, the race to bring the silver screen to the small screen commenced with the launch of pay television services showing premium content.

HBO launched on November 8, 1972, becoming the nation's first pay-television channel. On September 30, 1975, HBO became the first television network to continuously deliver signals via satellite when it showed the "Thrilla in Manila" boxing-match between Muhammad Ali and Joe Frazier.

Star Channel launched their service offerings nationally in 1973 through the delivery of movies on video tapes for cable providers to broadcast. This proved problematic since the videotapes were often riddled with technical difficulties. Star Channel eventually was linked up to satellite in January 1978. Shortly after, Warner Communications acquired the channel and relaunched it on December 1, 1979, in its current form as The Movie Channel.

Media giant Viacom launched their premium service, Showtime, nationally on July 1, 1976, after a brief, wildly successful test launch on their cable system in Dublin, California.

Australia
In 1974, Australian TV tests color transmissions (full-time color comes in 1975). Popular shows during the decade include, Young Talent Time, Number 96, The Aunty Jack Show, Class of '74, The Sullivans, The Don Lane Show, Cop Shop, The Naked Vicar Show, The Paul Hogan Show and Countdown.

South Africa
South Africa saw nationwide television service for the first time on January 5, 1976, although limited-view, locally available television began on May 5, 1975.

Computer and video games

 Popular and notable video games of the 1970s include: Space Invaders, Asteroids, Pong, and Breakout.
 Golden age of video arcade games
 Gun Fight was the first video game to contain a microprocessor.
 The Oregon Trail was the first publicly available educational video game made available for widespread use in schools on December 3, 1971. The game is a cult classic and is still used today, in a wide variety of formats, through emulators and on smart phones.
 The first commercially available video game console, entitled Magnavox Odyssey, was released in September 1972, created by Ralph H. Baer.
1974: Both Maze War (on the Imlac PDS-1 at the NASA Ames Research Center in California) and Spasim (on PLATO) appeared, pioneering examples of early multiplayer 3D first-person shooters.
 In 1976, Mattel introduced the first handheld electronic game with the release of Mattel Auto Race.
 Then, in 1976, William Crowther wrote the first modern text adventure game, Colossal Cave Adventure.
 Apple, Inc. ushered in the modern personal computing age with its June 1, 1977, launch of the first mass-produced personal computer, the Apple II. Although many business-focused personal workstations were available to corporations years earlier, the Apple II has the distinction of being the first to produce personal computers specifically targeted to home users, beating the Commodore PET and Atari 400 to the market by five months. Its initial price tag was US$4999.99 for the CPU only.
 The Atari 2600 was released in October 1977 and was a huge commercial success. It was challenged by the Magnavox Odyssey² and Intellivision.
 Fairchild Channel F from 1976 becomes the first programmable ROM cartridge-based video game console.
 The Microvision was the very first hand-held game console using interchangeable cartridges. It was released by the Milton Bradley Company in November 1979.

Sports

The 1972 Summer Olympics in Munich, Germany saw swimmer Mark Spitz set seven World Records and won a record seven gold medals. The 1976 Summer Olympics were held in Montreal, Quebec, Canada. Brazil won the 1970 FIFA World Cup in Mexico, West Germany won the 1974 FIFA World Cup in West Germany, and Argentina won the 1978 FIFA World Cup in Argentina. The 1970 FIFA World Cup was the first world cup to be televised in color.

On April 9, 1975, Asia's first professional basketball league, the Philippine Basketball Association (PBA) were played first game at the Araneta Coliseum in Cubao, Quezon City, Philippines.

United States
The Oakland Athletics three-peated at the World Series in 1972–1974.

The Cincinnati Reds go to the World Series in 1970, 1972, 1975, and 1976, led by the Big Red Machine winning two out of four.

The New York Yankees won the World Series in 1977 and 1978 after losing in 1976.

The Dallas Cowboys and the Pittsburgh Steelers dominated the decade in the NFL. Steelers were led by Terry Bradshaw and Chuck Noll, and the Cowboys were led by Roger Staubach and Tom Landry, while the Miami Dolphins became the only team in NFL history to go "all the way," winning the Super Bowl with an undefeated record—a feat that remains unmatched to this day.

The Philadelphia Flyers won the Stanley Cup in 1974 and 1975, a team best remembered as "The Broad Street Bullies".

Disc sports (Frisbee)
As numbers of young people became alienated from social norms, they resisted and looked for alternatives. They would form what would become known as the counterculture. The forms of escape and resistance would manifest in many ways including social activism, alternative lifestyles, experimental living through foods, dress, music and alternative recreational activities, including that of throwing a frisbee. What started with a few players like Victor Malafronte, Z Weyand and Ken Westerfield experimenting with new ways of throwing and catching a frisbee, later would become known as playing freestyle. Organized disc sports, in the 1970s, began with promotional efforts from Wham-O and Irwin Toy (Canada), a few tournaments and professionals using frisbee show tours to perform at universities, fairs and sporting events. Disc sports such as freestyle, double disc court, guts, disc ultimate and disc golf became this sports first events.

Literature

Fiction in the early '70s brought a return to old-fashioned storytelling, especially with Erich Segal's Love Story. The seventies also saw the decline of previously well-respected writers, such as Saul Bellow and Peter De Vries, who both released poorly received novels at the start of the decade. Racism remained a key literary subject. John Updike emerged as a major literary figure. Reflections of the 1960s experience also found roots in the literature of the decade through the works of Joyce Carol Oates and Wright Morris. With the rising cost of hard-cover books and the increasing readership of "genre fiction", the paperback became a popular medium. Criminal non-fiction also became a popular topic. Irreverence and satire, typified in Kurt Vonnegut's Breakfast of Champions, were common literary elements. The horror genre also emerged, and by the late 1970s Stephen King had become one of the most popular genre novelists. The postmodern author Thomas Pynchon published his most famous work, Gravity's Rainbow, in 1973.

In non-fiction, several books related to Nixon and the Watergate scandal topped the best-selling lists. 1977 brought many high-profile biographical works of literary figures, such as those of Virginia Woolf, Agatha Christie, and J. R. R. Tolkien.

The fake memoir Go Ask Alice was released in 1971. Upon its initial release the book was marketed as a real diary of a teenage girl who overdosed in the 1960s. However, it was later revealed that the book was actually written by Beatrice Sparks.

Architecture

Architecture in the 1970s began as a continuation of styles created by such architects as Frank Lloyd Wright and Ludwig Mies van der Rohe. Early in the decade, several architects competed to build the tallest building in the world. Of these buildings, the most notable are the John Hancock Center and Sears Tower in Chicago, both designed by Bruce Graham and Fazlur Khan, and the World Trade Center towers in New York by American architect Minoru Yamasaki. The decade also brought experimentation in geometric design, pop-art, postmodernism, and early deconstructivism.

Design trends in the 1970s were marked by a backlash against the bright colors and futurism of the 1950s and 1960s and a rise in popularity of dark, earthy tones with extensive use of brown, green, purple, and orange. Wood decor and paneling was integral to 1970s interior design as well, replacing the obsession of the 1950s and 1960s with chrome and aluminum. Darker colors not only reflected the back-to-nature mindset of the decade, but the sluggish world economy with its lowered optimism and expectations for the future.

In 1974, Louis Kahn's last and arguably most famous building, the National Assembly Building of Dhaka, Bangladesh, was completed. The building's use of open spaces and groundbreaking geometry brought rare attention to the small South Asian country. Hugh Stubbins's Citicorp Center revolutionized the incorporation of solar panels in office buildings. The seventies brought further experimentation in glass and steel construction and geometric design. Chinese architect I. M. Pei's John Hancock Tower in Boston, Massachusetts, is an example, although like many buildings of the time, the experimentation was flawed and glass panes fell from the façade. In 1976, the completed CN Tower in Toronto became the world's tallest free-standing structure on land, an honor it held until 2007. The fact that no taller tower had been built between the construction of the CN Tower and the Burj Khalifa shows how innovative the architecture and engineering of the structure truly was.

Modern architecture was increasingly criticized as the decade went on from the point of view of postmodern architects, such as Philip Johnson, Charles Moore, and Michael Graves, who advocated a return to pre-modern styles of architecture and the incorporation of pop elements as a means of communicating with a broader public. Other architects, such as Peter Eisenman of the New York Five, advocated the pursuit of form for the sake of form and drew on semiotics theory for support.

"High Tech" architecture moved forward as Buckminster Fuller continued his experiments in geodesic domes, while the Georges Pompidou Center, designed by Renzo Piano and Richard Rogers, which opened in 1977, was a prominent example. As the decade drew to a close, Frank Gehry broke out in new direction with his own house in Santa Monica, a highly complex structure, half excavated out of an existing bungalow and half cheaply built construction using materials such as chicken wire fencing.

Terracotta Army figures, dating from 210 BC, were discovered in 1974 by some local farmers in Lintong District, Xi'an, Shaanxi Province, China, near the Mausoleum of the First Qin Emperor (Chinese: 秦始皇陵; pinyin: Qín Shǐhuáng Ling). In 1978, electrical workers in Mexico City found the remains of the Great Pyramid of Tenochtitlan in the middle of the city.

Fashion

Clothing styles during the 1970s were influenced by outfits seen in popular music groups and in Hollywood films. In clothing, prints, especially from India and other parts of the world, were fashionable.

Much of the 1970s fashion styles were influenced by the hippie movement. As well as the hippie look, the 70s also gave way to glam rock styles, started off by David Bowie who was named the King of Glam Rock. Glam was a genderbent and outlandish style.

Significant fashion trends of the 1970s include:

 Bell-bottomed pants remained popular throughout the decade. These combined with turtle necked shirts and flower-prints to form the characteristic 1970s look. In the later part of the decade, this gave way to three-piece suits, in large part because of the movie Saturday Night Fever.
 Sideburns were popular for men, particularly mutton chops; as were beards and mustaches which had been out of fashion since the 19th and early 20th century.
 Women's hairstyles went from long and straight in the first half of the decade to the feathery cut of Farrah Fawcett, a trend that continued through the first half of the 1980s. 
 Miniskirts and minidresses were still popular in the first half of the decade, particularly with pleated "rah-rah" skirts with higher hemlines; but they were quickly phased out by the mid-70s in favor of hot pants. However, miniskirts and minidresses never totally went away, and they made a return to mainstream fashion in the mid-1980s and has remained a fashion staple in the decades since.
 Halter tops and hot pants became a popular summer outfit among young women and teenage girls in the second half of the decade. 
 Platform shoes
 Leisure suits
 Mohawk hairstyle was associated with punk subculture
 Flokati rugs
 Lava lamps
 Papasan chairs

People

Actors / Entertainers

 Jack Albertson
 Alan Alda
 Nancy Allen
 Woody Allen
 John Amos
 Ursula Andress
 Julie Andrews
 Alan Arkin
 James Arness 
 Bea Arthur
 Ed Asner
 Richard Attenborough
 Dan Aykroyd
 Amitabh Bachchan
 Barbara Bain
 Conrad Bain
 Carroll Baker
 Tom Baker
 Martin Balsam
 Nathalie Baye
 Ned Beatty
 Warren Beatty
 Ed Begley Jr.
 Jean-Paul Belmondo
 John Belushi
 Ingrid Bergman
 Jacqueline Bisset
 Bill Bixby
 Karen Black
 Linda Blair
 Robert Blake
 Mel Blanc
 Ernest Borgnine
 Tom Bosley
 Peter Boyle
 Marlon Brando
 Eric Braeden
 Beau Bridges
 Jeff Bridges
 Eileen Brennan
 James Brolin
 Mel Brooks
 Charles Bronson
 Jim Brown
 Roscoe Lee Browne
 Yul Brynner
 Carol Burnett
 Ellen Burstyn
 Richard Burton
 Raymond Burr
 James Caan
 Sid Caesar
 Michael Caine
 Colleen Camp
 John Candy
 David Carradine
 George Carlin
 Diahann Carroll
 Johnny Carson
 Dixie Carter
 Lynda Carter
 David Cassidy
 John Cassavetes
 Richard Chamberlain
 Charlie Chaplin
 Geraldine Chaplin
 Jackie Chan
 Chevy Chase
 Julie Christie
 Jill Clayburgh
 John Cleese
 James Coburn
 James Coco
 Julie Dawn Cole
 Joan Collins
 Sean Connery
 Mike Connors
 Tim Conway
 Bill Cosby
 Bob Crane
 Richard Crenna
 Billy Crystal
 Tony Curtis
 Peter Cushing
 Bill Daily
 Rodney Dangerfield
 Dom DeLuise
 Alain Delon
 Catherine Deneuve
 Brian Dennehy
 Robert De Niro
 Bruce Dern
 Danny DeVito
 Joyce DeWitt
 Kirk Douglas
 Michael Douglas
 David Doyle
 Richard Dreyfuss
 Patrick Duffy
 Faye Dunaway
 Charles Durning
 Robert Duvall
 Shelley Duvall
 Clint Eastwood
 Barbara Eden
 Britt Ekland
 Sam Elliott
 Robert Englund
 Peter Falk
 Jamie Farr
 Mia Farrow
 Farrah Fawcett
 José Ferrer
 Mel Ferrer
 Sally Field
 Albert Finney
 Carrie Fisher
 Jane Fonda
 Peter Fonda
 Harrison Ford
 Robert Forster
 Jodie Foster
 Redd Foxx
 Anthony Franciosa
 Morgan Freeman
 James Garner
 Richard Gere
 Henry Gibson
 Mel Gibson
 Terry Gilliam
 Louis Gossett Jr.
 Elliott Gould
 Linda Gray
 Pam Grier
 Merv Griffin
 Melanie Griffith
 Robert Guillaume
 Alec Guinness
 Gene Hackman
 Larry Hagman
 Mark Hamill
 Valerie Harper
 Richard Harris
 Rutger Hauer
 Goldie Hawn
 Katherine Helmond
 Sherman Hemsley
 Florence Henderson
 Lance Henriksen
 Jim Henson
 Charlton Heston
 Dustin Hoffman
 Paul Hogan
 Hal Holbrook
 William Holden
 Ian Holm
 James Hong
 Anthony Hopkins
 Dennis Hopper
 Bob Hoskins
 Ron Howard
 Susan Howard
 Rock Hudson
 John Hurt
 Eric Idle
 Kate Jackson
 Don Johnson
 Olivia Newton-John
 James Earl Jones
 Shirley Jones
 Terry Jones
 Tommy Lee Jones
 Madeline Kahn
 Carol Kane
 Gabe Kaplan
 Casey Kasem
 Julie Kavner
 Diane Keaton
 Harvey Keitel
 Sally Kellerman
 George Kennedy
 Margot Kidder
 Richard Kiel
 Sally Kirkland
 Jack Klugman
 Don Knotts
 Harvey Korman
 Yaphet Kotto
 Kris Kristofferson
 Cheryl Ladd
 Burt Lancaster
 Martin Landau
 Michael Landon
 Vicki Lawrence
 George Lazenby
 Cloris Leachman
 Bruce Lee
 Christopher Lee
 Jack Lemmon
 Jerry Lewis
 Hal Linden
 John Lithgow
 Christopher Lloyd
 Jack Lord
 Sophia Loren
 James MacArthur
 Shirley MacLaine
 Gavin MacLeod
 Lee Majors
 Ann-Margret
 Penny Marshall
 Dean Martin
 Steve Martin
 Lee Marvin
 James Mason
 Marcello Mastroianni
 Walter Matthau
 David McCallum
 Rue McClanahan
 Kent McCord
 Roddy McDowall
 Malcolm McDowell
 Steve McQueen
 Ian McShane
 Günter Meisner
 Burgess Meredith
 Lee Meriwether
 Martin Milner
 Liza Minnelli
 Helen Mirren
 Ricardo Montalbán
 Roger Moore
 Mary Tyler Moore
 Jeanne Moreau
 Rita Moreno
 Harry Morgan
 Pat Morita
 Richard Mulligan
 Don Murray
 Bob Newhart
 Paul Newman
 Jack Nicholson
 Denise Nickerson
 Leslie Nielsen
 Nick Nolte
 Chuck Norris
 Carroll O'Connor
 Ryan O'Neal
 Peter Ostrum
 Peter O'Toole
 Al Pacino
 Michael Palin
 Jack Palance
 Gregory Peck
 Anthony Perkins
 Jon Pertwee
 Michelle Phillips
 Donald Pleasence
 Suzanne Pleshette
 Christopher Plummer
 Sidney Poitier
 Richard Pryor
 Anthony Quinn
 Gilda Radner
 Tony Randall
 Robert Redford
 Vanessa Redgrave
 Robert Reed
 Christopher Reeve
 Rob Reiner
 Burt Reynolds
 Don Rickles
 Diana Rigg
 John Ritter
 Joan Rivers
 Jason Robards
 Cliff Robertson
 Richard Roundtree
 Marion Ross
 Kurt Russell
 Isabel Sanford
 Susan Sarandon
 Telly Savalas
 John Saxon
 Roy Scheider
 Maximilian Schell
 Arnold Schwarzenegger
 George C. Scott
 Jean Seberg
 George Segal
 Tom Selleck
 Peter Sellers
 Jane Seymour
 Omar Sharif
 William Shatner
 Martin Sheen
 Cybill Shepherd
 Talia Shire
 Frank Sinatra
 Tom Skerritt
 Jaclyn Smith
 Maggie Smith
 Suzanne Somers
 Sissy Spacek
 Joe Spinell
 Robert Stack
 Sylvester Stallone
 Terence Stamp
 Harry Dean Stanton
 Susan Strasberg
 Jean Stapleton
 McLean Stevenson
 Dean Stockwell
 Woody Strode
 Meryl Streep
 Barbra Streisand
 Sally Struthers
 Donald Sutherland
 Loretta Swit
 Max von Sydow
 Elizabeth Taylor
 John Thaw
 Paris Themmen
 Richard Thomas
 Lily Tomlin
 Rip Torn
 John Travolta
 Jean-Louis Trintignant
 Cicely Tyson
 Liv Ullmann
 Robert Urich
 Dick Van Dyke
 Robert Vaughn
 Hervé Villechaize
 Jon Voight
 Lindsay Wagner
 Robert Wagner
 Ralph Waite
 Christopher Walken
 Eli Wallach
 M. Emmet Walsh
 Jack Warden
 Sam Waterston
 John Wayne
 Carl Weathers
 Raquel Welch
 Betty White
 Gene Wilder
 Fred Willard
 Cindy Williams
 Billy Dee Williams
 Robin Williams
 Fred Williamson
 Demond Wilson
 Paul Winfield
 Henry Winkler
 Jonathan Winters
 Shelley Winters
 Joanne Woodward
 James Woods
 Michael York
 Burt Young

Filmmakers

 Woody Allen
 Robert Altman
 Michelangelo Antonioni
 Dario Argento
 Ingmar Bergman
 Bernardo Bertolucci
 John Boorman
 Luis Buñuel
 Michael Cimino
 Jack Clayton
 Francis Ford Coppola
 John Carpenter
 Richard Donner
 Clint Eastwood
 Richard Fleischer
 Miloš Forman
 Bob Fosse
 William Friedkin
 Ridley Scott
 Steven Spielberg
 Martin Scorsese
 Stanley Kubrick
 Joseph L. Mankiewicz
 George Lucas
 Akira Kurosawa
 Brian De Palma
 Roman Polanski
 Sergio Leone
 Terry Gilliam
 Werner Herzog
 Sidney Lumet
 Andreï Tarkovsky
 Arthur Penn
 Alan Parker
 Terrence Malick
 Tobe Hooper
 John Huston
 Ettore Scola
 David Lean
 Sam Peckinpah
 Tonino Valerii
 François Truffaut
 Pier Paolo Pasolini
 Don Siegel
 Dalton Trumbo
 Luchino Visconti
 David Lynch
 Frederico Fellini
 George A. Romero
 Sydney Pollack
 Alan J. Pakula
 John Schlesinger
 Alfred Hitchcock
 George Miller
 Bob Rafelson
 Alejandro Jodorowsky
 Franklin J. Schaffner
 Costa-Gavras
 Elia Kazan
 Norman Jewison
 Peter Weir

Musicians

 Bill Anderson
 Lynn Anderson
 Paul Anka
 Chet Atkins
 Joan Baez
 Jeff Beck
 Captain Beefheart
 Tony Bennett
 George Benson
 Bobby Bland
 Marc Bolan
 Pat Boone
 David Bowie
 James Brown
 Jackson Browne
 Peabo Bryson
 Jimmy Buffett
 Eric Burdon
 Jerry Butler
 Glen Campbell
 John Cale
 Johnny Cash
 David Cassidy
 Harry Chapin
 Ray Charles
 Sonny & Cher
 Lou Christie
 Eric Clapton
 Roy Clark
 Joe Cocker
 David Allan Coe
 Leonard Cohen
 Rita Coolidge
 Alice Cooper
 Elvis Costello
 Jim Croce
 David Crosby
 Roger Daltrey
 Charlie Daniels
 Bobby Darin
 Miles Davis
 John Denver
 Neil Diamond
 Nick Drake
 George Duke
 Bob Dylan
 Donovan
 Peter Frampton
 Bryan Ferry
 Roberta Flack
 Aretha Franklin
 Rory Gallagher
 Marvin Gaye
 Crystal Gayle 
 Dizzy Gillespie
 Eddy Grant
 Al Green
 Simon & Garfunkel
 Hall & Oates
 Merle Haggard
 George Harrison
 Emmylou Harris
 Isaac Hayes
 Jimi Hendrix
 Wanda Jackson
 Etta James
 Rick James
 Sonny James
 Al Jarreau
 Waylon Jennings
 Billy Joel
 Elton John
 Janis Joplin
 George Jones
 Quincy Jones
 Tom Jones
 B.B. King
 Ben E. King
 Carole King
 Kris Kristofferson
 Brenda Lee
 Jerry Lee Lewis
 John Lennon
 Gordon Lightfoot
 Meat Loaf
 Kenny Loggins
 Loretta Lynn
 Barry Manilow
 Bob Marley
 Johnny Mathis
 Curtis Mayfield
 John Mayall
 Paul McCartney
 Don McLean
 Bette Midler
 Roger Miller
 Charles Mingus
 Joni Mitchell
 Eddie Money
 Van Morrison
 Anne Murray
 Johnny Nash
 Willie Nelson
 Olivia Newton-John
 Harry Nilsson
 Ted Nugent
 Yoko Ono
 Roy Orbison
 Buck Owens
 Gilbert O'Sullivan
 Robert Palmer
 Dolly Parton
 Johnny Paycheck
 Iggy Pop
 Elvis Presley
 Billy Preston
 Ray Price
 Charley Pride
 Eddie Rabbitt
 Lou Rawls
 Jerry Reed
 Lou Reed
 Helen Reddy
 Cliff Richard
 Little Richard
 Jeannie C. Riley
 Smokey Robinson
 Marty Robbins
 Kenny Rogers
 Linda Ronstadt
 Diana Ross
 Leon Russell
 Leo Sayer
 Jeannie Seely
 Neil Sedaka
 Bob Seger
 Carly Simon
 Paul Simon
 Nina Simone
 Nancy Sinatra
 Connie Smith
 Patti Smith
 Ringo Starr
 Rod Stewart
 Cat Stevens
 Barbra Streisand
 Bruce Springsteen
 Dusty Springfield
 Rick Springfield
 Donna Summer
 James Taylor
 Captain & Tennille
 Ike & Tina Turner
 Mel Tillis
 Peter Tosh
 Conway Twitty
 Luther Vandross
 Porter Wagoner
 Dionne Warwick
 Dottie West
 Barry White
 Bill Withers
 Andy Williams
 Nancy Wilson
 Johnny Winter
 Bobby Womack
 Stevie Wonder
 Gary Wright
 Tammy Wynette
 Faron Young
 Neil Young
 Frank Zappa
 Marc Bolan

Bands

 ABBA
 AC/DC
 Aerosmith
 The Allman Brothers Band
 America
 The B-52's
 The Band
 The Beach Boys
 Bee Gees
 Black Sabbath
 Blondie
 Blue Öyster Cult
 Boston
 Bread
 The Byrds
 The Cars
 Chicago
 The Clash
 Creedence Clearwater Revival
 Crosby, Stills, Nash & Young
 Deep Purple
 Devo
 Dire Straits
 The Doors
 Dr. Hook & the Medicine Show
 Eagles
 Earth, Wind & Fire
 Electric Light Orchestra
 Emerson, Lake & Palmer
 Fleetwood Mac
 Foreigner
 Genesis
 Grateful Dead
 Heart
 The Hollies
 The Jackson 5
 Jefferson Starship
 Jethro Tull
 Journey
 Kansas
 The Kinks
 Kiss
 Gladys Knight & the Pips
 Kool & the Gang
 Kraftwerk
 King Crimson
 Led Zeppelin
 Lynyrd Skynyrd
 The Marshall Tucker Band
 Paul McCartney and Wings
 MFSB
 Motörhead
 Plastic Ono Band
 The Osmonds
 The Alan Parsons Project
 Tom Petty and the Heartbreakers
 Pink Floyd
 The Police
 Queen
 Rainbow
 Ramones
 T. Rex
 The Tubes
 The Rolling Stones
 Rush
 Seals & Crofts
 Sex Pistols
 The Staple Singers
 The Statler Brothers
 Styx
 Supertramp
 The Supremes
 Talking Heads
 The Temptations
 Thin Lizzy
 Van Halen
 Village People
 The Walker Brothers
 The Who
 Yes
 ZZ Top

Writers

 Douglas Adams
 Maya Angelou
 Isaac Asimov
 James Baldwin
 Amiri Baraka
 Peter Benchley
 Judy Blume
 Jorge Luis Borges
 Ray Bradbury
 André Brink
 Octavia E. Butler
 Anthony Burgess
 John le Carré
 Arthur C. Clarke
 Jackie Collins
 Michael Crichton
 Robertson Davies
 Richard Dawkins
 Samuel R. Delany
 Philip K. Dick
 James Dickey
 E. L. Doctorow
 Ken Follett
 Frederick Forsyth
 John Fowles
 Carlos Fuentes
 Eduardo Galeano
 Nikki Giovanni
 William Goldman
 Nadine Gordimer
 Günter Grass
 Ursula K. Le Guin
 Seamus Heaney
 Robert A. Heinlein
 Frank Herbert
 Eleanor Hibbert
 Jack Higgins
 John Irving
 P. D. James
 Ryszard Kapuściński
 Stephen King
 Jack Kirby
 Stan Lee
 Robert Ludlum
 Norman Mailer
 Gabriel García Márquez
 George R. R. Martin
 James A. Michener
 Toni Morrison
 Iris Murdoch
 V. S. Naipaul
 Terry Pratchett
 Mario Puzo
 Thomas Pynchon
 Ruth Rendell
 Harold Robbins
 Philip Roth
 Erich Segal
 Maurice Sendak
 Dr. Seuss
 Irwin Shaw
 Sidney Sheldon
 Josef Škvorecký
 William Styron
 Jacqueline Susann
 Hunter S. Thompson
 John Updike
 Gore Vidal
 Kurt Vonnegut
 Alice Walker
 Tom Wolfe
 Herman Wouk
 Roger Zelazny

Sports figures

 André the Giant
 Hank Aaron
 Mario Andretti
 Kareem Abdul-Jabbar
 Carlos Alberto Torres
 Bobby Allison
 Muhammad Ali
 Nate Archibald
 Arthur Ashe
 Mykola Avilov
 Gordon Banks
 Rick Barry
 Shirley Babashoff
 Franz Beckenbauer
 Johnny Bench
 George Best
 Dave Bing
 Björn Borg
 Valeriy Borzov
 Bill Bradley
 Terry Bradshaw
 Lou Brock
 Bobby Charlton
 Jack Charlton
 Wilt Chamberlain
 Bobby Clarke
 Roberto Clemente
 Nadia Comăneci
 Jimmy Connors
 Hasely Crawford
 Billy Cunningham
 Dave Cowens
 Johan Cruyff
 Larry Csonka
 Kenny Dalglish
 Dave DeBusschere
 Eusébio
 Roy Emerson
 Julius Erving
 Phil Esposito
 Chris Evert
 Carlton Fisk
 Ric Flair
 George Foreman
 Joe Frazier
 Walt Frazier
 Claudio Gentile
 George Gervin
 Bob Gibson
 Artis Gilmore
 Evonne Goolagong
 Gail Goodrich
 Dorothy Hamill
 John Havlicek
 Connie Hawkins
 Bob Hayes
 Elvin Hayes
 Spencer Haywood
 Ottmar Hitzfeld
 Uli Hoeneß
 Larry Holmes
 Dan Issel
 Reggie Jackson
 Jairzinho
 Caitlyn Jenner (then known as Bruce Jenner)
 Alberto Juantorena
 Kevin Keegan
 Kipchoge Keino
 Mario Kempes
 Billie Jean King
 Guy Lafleur
 Niki Lauda
 Rod Laver
 Moses Malone
 Pete Maravich
 Roland Matthes
 Bob McAdoo
 Willie McCovey
 John McEnroe
 Pietro Mennea
 Earl Monroe
 Pedro Morales
 Joe Morgan
 Edwin Moses
 Gerd Müller
 Calvin Murphy
 John Naber
 Johan Neeskens
 Jack Nicklaus
 Ken Norton
 Tom Okker
 Bobby Orr
 Wolfgang Overath
 Arnold Palmer
 Jim Palmer
 Bernie Parent
 Pat Patterson
 Walter Payton 
 Pelé
 Tony Pérez
 Richard Petty
 Roddy Piper
 Annemarie Moser-Pröll
 Harley Race
 Willis Reed
 Dusty Rhodes
 Rivellino
 Oscar Robertson
 Frank Robinson
 Larry Robinson
 Pete Rose
 Ken Rosewall
 Nolan Ryan
 Börje Salming
 Viktor Saneyev
 Randy Savage
 Mike Schmidt
 Arnold Schwarzenegger
 Tom Seaver
 Earnie Shavers
 O. J. Simpson
 Stan Smith
 Sócrates
 Leon Spinks
 Mark Spitz
 Ken Stabler
 Willie Stargell
 Roger Staubach
 Big John Studd
 Nate Thurmond
 Wes Unseld
 Guillermo Vilas
 Berti Vogts
 Bill Walton
 Arsène Wenger
 Jerry West
 Paul Westphal
 Jo Jo White
 Jamaal Wilkes
 Lenny Wilkens
 Mac Wilkins
 Carl Yastrzemski
 Dino Zoff
 Zico

See also

 1970s in music
 1970s in fashion
 1970s in television
 1970s in literature

Timeline
The following articles contain brief timelines which list the most prominent events of the decade:

1970 • 1971 • 1972 • 1973 • 1974 • 1975 • 1976 • 1977 • 1978 • 1979

References

Further reading
 Borstelmann, Thomas. The 1970s: A New Global History From Civil Rights to Economic Inequality (Princeton University Press; 2012) 401 pages; looks at new right movements, and the global impact of economic deregulation. excerpt; also online review
 Ferguson, Niall, and Charles S. Maier, eds. The Shock of the Global: The 1970s in Perspective (2011) essays by leading scholars; 448 pp
 La Barca, Giuseppe. International Trade in the 1970s: The U.S., the EC, and the Growing Pressure of Protectionism (London: Bloomsbury, 2013) 224 pp.
 Padva, Gilad. Sexing the Past: Communal Exposure and Self-Examination in Gay Sex in the 70s. In Padva, Gilad, Queer Nostalgia in Cinema and Pop Culture, pp. 58–71 (Palgrave Macmillan, 2014).
 Wheen, Francis. Strange Days Indeed: The 1970s: The Golden Days of Paranoia (2010) 352pp; looks at general irrationalism (such as UFOs, psychic phenomena, mad cults), and terror (IRA bombings; Black September massacre at the Munich Olympics; Baader-Meinhof Gang in Germany; Symbionese Liberation Army.)

United States
 Berkowitz, Edward D. Something Happened: A Political and Cultural Overview of the Seventies (Columbia University Press, 2006). 283 pp., liberal perspective
 Carroll, Peter.  It Seemed Like Nothing Happened: The Tragedy and Promise of America in the 1970s (1982)
 Cowie, Jefferson R. Stayin' Alive: The 1970s and the Last Days of the Working Class (2010) excerpt, on U.S.
 Frum, David.  How We Got Here: The 70s (2000), conservative perspective excerpt and text search
 Haberman, Clyde, ed. The New York Times: The Times of the Seventies The Culture, Politics, and Personalities that Shaped the Decade (2013)
 Kalman, Laura. Right Star Rising: A New Politics, 1974–1980 (2010) 473pp; excerpt and text search
Lehman, Katherine J.   Those Girls: Single Women in Sixties and Seventies Popular Culture (University Press of Kansas, 2011).  280 pp. online review
  Sandbrook, Dominic. Mad as Hell: The Crisis of the 1970s and the Rise of the Populist Right (2012)  excerpt and text search
 Schulman, Bruce.  The Seventies: The Great Shift in American Culture, Society, and Politics (2001) excerpt and text search
 Stein, Judith. Pivotal Decade: How the United States Traded Factories for Finance in the Seventies (2010) 384pp excerpt and text search

Britain
 Beckett, Andy. When the Lights Went Out: Britain in the Seventies (2009) 576pp excerpt and textsearch
 Booker, Christopher. The Seventies: The Decade That Changed the Future (1980)
 Sandbrook,  Dominic. State of Emergency: The Way We Were: Britain 1970–1974 (2010) 
 Sandbrook,  Dominic.  Mad As Hell: The Crisis of the 1970s and the Rise of the Populist Right (2011) 
 Sandbrook,  Dominic.  Seasons in the Sun: The Battle for Britain, 1974–1979 (2012)
 Turner, Alwyn W. Crisis? What Crisis?: Britain in the 1970s (2009) 336pp excerpt and text search
 Wybrow, Robert J. Britain Speaks Out, 1937–87: A social history as seen through the Gallup data (1989)

External links

 Heroes of the 1970s – slideshow by Life magazine
 www.ultimate70s.com – Day-by-day news, sports, weather, prime-time TV listings and more!

 
20th century
1970s decade overviews